Wade Flemons (born August 26, 1960) is a Canadian former backstroke swimmer.

Flemons trained at the Hollyburn Country Club while growing up in Vancouver, British Columbia.

A backstroke specialist, Flemons swam at two World Championships and qualified for the 1980 Moscow Olympics, which Canada ultimately boycotted. Swimming in the 100 metre backstroke, he came sixth at the 1979 Pan American Games, won bronze at 1982 Commonwealth Games and was fourth at the 1983 Pan American Games. He was a collegiate swimmer for Stanford University and won an NCAA Division I championship in the 200 yard backstroke.

References

External links

1960 births
Living people
Canadian male backstroke swimmers
Swimmers from Vancouver
Stanford Cardinal men's swimmers
Commonwealth Games bronze medallists for Canada
Commonwealth Games medallists in swimming
Medallists at the 1982 Commonwealth Games
Swimmers at the 1978 Commonwealth Games
Swimmers at the 1982 Commonwealth Games
Swimmers at the 1979 Pan American Games
Swimmers at the 1983 Pan American Games
Pan American Games competitors for Canada